Amita Suman (born 19 July 1997) is a Nepal–born British actress. She stars as Inej Ghafa in the Netflix series Shadow and Bone. She had a recurring role as Naya in The CW series The Outpost.

Early life
Suman was born in Kalikamai Rural Municipality (formerly Bhedihari VDC) of Parsa District in southern region of Nepal, to a Bhojpuri-speaking family, and is also fluent in the language herself. She went to Saint Xavier School in Birgunj. At the age of seven, Suman moved to Brighton, England. She attended Varndean Secondary School and Sussex Downs College (now East Sussex College Lewes) before going on to train at the Academy of Live and Recorded Arts, graduating in 2018.
When Suman lived in Nepal she had no education, no indoor plumbing, no electricity, had hay for insulation and they had to grow their own foods. She moved out with her family in Brighton when she was seven. Suman didn't know English when she arrived in Brighton. She stated "I was so introverted and so insecure and so aware of how different I was that I couldn't talk to people, so I found it really hard to make friends. I didn't speak the language very well. I didn't know anything about British culture".

Career
Shortly after graduating, Suman made her television debut with minor roles in Casualty and Ackley Bridge. She landed a major guest role in the Doctor Who series 11 episode "Demons of the Punjab" as a young version of companion Yasmin Khan's grandmother, Umbreen. Suman took over the recurring role of Naya from Medalion Rahimi in season 2 of the CW series The Outpost. In October 2019, it was announced Suman would star as Inej Ghafa in the 2021 Netflix series Shadow and Bone, an adaptation of the fantasy book series The Grisha Trilogy and the Six of Crows Duology by Leigh Bardugo.

Filmography

References

External links

Living people
1997 births
Actresses from Brighton
Alumni of the Academy of Live and Recorded Arts
British actresses of South Asian descent
Nepalese emigrants to the United Kingdom
People educated at East Sussex College
People from Parsa District